Timothy Michael John Simmons CVO (born 8 April 1960) is a former British diplomat.

He was educated at Kent School, Hostert, in Germany and the University of East Anglia. He served as British Ambassador to Slovenia from 2005 to 2009.

References

1960 births
Living people
Alumni of the University of East Anglia
Ambassadors of the United Kingdom to Slovenia
Commanders of the Royal Victorian Order